Imad Baba (born March 15, 1974) is a former American soccer midfielder. He spent seven years in Major League Soccer (MLS) with the New England Revolution and Colorado Rapids. He was also a member of the American squads at the 1989 U-16 World Championships, 1993 U-20 World Cup and the 1996 Summer Olympics. Baba earned one cap with the senior United States national team.

Club career

Early career
Baba's father moved to Texas from Palestine. Baba was born and raised in Texas. In 1990, he was given a trial at Manchester United, but failed to impress. He was the 1992 Texas High School Player of the Year and a four-time Parade Magazine high school All-American, the only player to earn that honor four times. After high school, he attended the Clemson University where he played on the men's soccer team for three seasons from 1993 to 1995. A varsity starter as a freshman, Baba elected to skip his last season in order to turn professional.

Professional career
On March 4, 1996, the New England Revolution selected Baba in the second round (16th overall) of the 1996 MLS College Draft. Baba spent five seasons with the Revs. He became a free agent on December 21, 2000. The Revs traded him to the Colorado Rapids for Matt Okoh, the rights to Alan Woods and a second round draft pick on March 19, 2001. Baba spent the next two seasons with the Rapids before announcing his retirement on June 13, 2002.

International
Baba entered the national team program with the U-16 team as it went through qualifications for the 1989 U-16 World Championship. The U.S. easily qualified only to go 1-1-1 in group play and fail to make the second round. However, Baba scored the lone U.S. goal in its victory over Brazil, the first U.S. goal of the tournament.

Baba went on to play for the U.S. at the 1993 U-20 World Cup in Australia. Baba scored a goal in the 6-0 victory over Turkey in the first U.S. game of the tournament. Once again this was the first U.S. goal of the tournament. The U.S. again went 1-1-1 in group play, but this time it advanced to the second round where the team met Brazil. This time the results were not so favorable to the U.S. as it fell 3-0 to Brazil.

In 1995, Baba again played with the U.S., this time as part of the U-23 national team at the Pan American Games. In this tournament, he started two of the three U.S. games as the U.S. crashed out with an 0-3 record.

He was a member of the Olympic soccer team at the 1996 Summer Olympics. The U.S. went 1-1-1 yet again, but this was not good enough to qualify for the second round.

Baba earned his only cap with the senior United States national team on January 24, 1999, in a scoreless tie with Bolivia when he came on for Eddie Lewis in the 75th minute.

External links
 Sams-Army profile
 New England Revolution fan profile

1974 births
Living people
American soccer players
Soccer players from Texas
People from Humble, Texas
American people of Palestinian descent
Parade High School All-Americans (boys' soccer)
United States men's international soccer players
Clemson Tigers men's soccer players
New England Revolution players
Colorado Rapids players
Olympic soccer players of the United States
Footballers at the 1996 Summer Olympics
Major League Soccer players
United States men's youth international soccer players
United States men's under-20 international soccer players
United States men's under-23 international soccer players
Pan American Games competitors for the United States
Footballers at the 1995 Pan American Games
New England Revolution draft picks
Association football midfielders